John Buckley may refer to:

Politicians
 John Buckley (Canadian politician) (1863–1942), member of the Legislative Assembly of Alberta, 1921–1935
 John Buckley (attorney) (1885–1959), Connecticut politician
 John Buckley (Virginia politician) (born 1953), Virginia politician
 John Francis Buckley (1891–1931), barrister, soldier, and Canadian federal politician
 John F. Buckley (1892–1965), Wisconsin politician
 John J. Buckley (mayor) (1915–1997), Massachusetts politician, mayor of Lawrence, Massachusetts
 John J. Buckley (sheriff) (1929–1994), Sheriff of Middlesex County, Massachusetts
 John L. Buckley (1900–after 1948), New York politician
 John R. Buckley (1932–2020), Massachusetts politician

Sportspeople
 John Buckley (baseball) (1869–1942), American baseball pitcher
 John Buckley (cricketer) (born 1956), South African cricketer
 John Buckley (footballer, born 1962), Scottish football manager and former professional footballer 
 John Buckley (footballer, born 1999), English footballer
 John Buckley (Aghabullogue hurler) (1863–1935), Irish hurler for Cork and Aghabullogue
 John Buckley (Glen Rovers hurler) (born 1958), Irish hurler for Cork and Glen Rovers

Other
 John Buckley, Australian artist, director of Institute of Modern Art 1976–79
 John Buckley (martyr) (died 1598), English religious leader and martyr
 John Buckley (bishop) (born 1939), Irish Catholic religious leader
 John Buckley (composer) (born 1951), Irish composer
 John Buckley (historian) (born 1967), professor of military history at the University of Wolverhampton
 John Buckley (sculptor) (born 1945), English sculptor 
 John Buckley (VC) (1813–1876), British Victoria Cross recipient
 John C. Buckley (1842–1913), American Civil War soldier and Medal of Honor recipient